German submarine U-137 was a Type IID U-boat of Nazi Germany's Kriegsmarine in World War II. Her keel was laid down on 16 November 1939 by Deutsche Werke in Kiel. She was launched on 18 May 1940 and commissioned on 15 June 1940 with Oberleutnant zur See Herbert Wohlfarth in command.

She was scuttled on 5 May 1945 at Wilhelmshaven, a week before Germany's surrender. U-137 never suffered any casualties to her crew.

Design
German Type IID submarines were enlarged versions of the original Type IIs. U-137 had a displacement of  when at the surface and  while submerged. She had two shafts and two  propellers.

U-137 was fitted with three  torpedo tubes at the bow, five torpedoes or up to twelve Type A torpedo mines, and a  anti-aircraft gun. The boat had a complement of 25.

Operational career

First patrol
U-137 made the short journey from Kiel to Stavanger in Norway in September 1940. It was from the Nordic port that she began her first patrol on the 21st. Her route took her through the gap between the Faroe and Shetland Islands and on in to the Atlantic west of Scotland and Ireland.

She sank Manchester Brigade west of Malin Head on the 26th and damaged Ashantian on the same date. The ship had been abandoned by her crew; the master and eight crew-members had returned to the vessel where the master was scandalized to see that the ship had been looted following the presence of a boarding party from the armed trawler HMS Wolves. Ashantian was repaired and returned to service in September 1941. She was sunk in April 1943.

Continuing her success, the U-boat sank Stratford, in the same general area as her other victims, also on the 26th.

U-137 arrived at Lorient on the French Atlantic coast, on 29 September.

Second patrol

Having set off from Lorient on 9 October, U-137 returned there on the 17th.

Third patrol
Sortie number three commenced with U-137s departure from Lorient on 3 November 1940 and returning to her old hunting grounds west of Scotland and north of Ireland. Her run of victories continued, sinking Cape St. Andrew west north-west of Aran Island on the 13th; Planter on the 16th north north-west of Bloody Foreland and two ships on the same day, from the same convoy (HG-46), Veronica and Saint Germain north north-west of Tory Island on 17 November.

The submarine steamed to Norway, again round the British Isles, docking in Bergen, on 22 November.

Fourth patrol
The boat's last operational patrol was to the north of the Shetland Islands, but she did not attack any targets. She then moved from Bergen to Helsingör in Denmark and on to Kiel, arriving there on 29 August 1941.

Fate
U-137 became a 'school' (or training) boat in December 1940, a position she would hold for the rest of the war. She was one of many that were scuttled in Raederschleuse (a lock named after the Grand Admiral), in Wilhelmshaven, on 5 May 1945. The wreck was broken up, although the post-war date is unknown.

Summary of raiding history

References

Notes

Citations

Bibliography

External links

 

1940 ships
German Type II submarines
Ships built in Kiel
U-boats commissioned in 1940
World War II shipwrecks in the North Sea
World War II submarines of Germany
Operation Regenbogen (U-boat)
Maritime incidents in May 1945